Genographics may refer to a number of things:

PC-GenoGraphics, a visual database/query facility designed for reasoning with genomic data
GenoGraphics, a generic utility for constructing and querying one-dimensional linear plots
The Genographic Project
Genetic genealogy gone global